Gandaki College of Engineering and Science (Nepali: गण्डकी कलेज अफ इन्जीनियरिङ्ग एण्ड साईन्स), referred to as GCES, is an independent non-profit institution co-located with the Gandaki Boarding School (GBS) in Lamachaur, Pokhara. Established with the genuine effort of Dr. P.V. Chandy, the then principal of GBS, GCES was founded in 1998 as an extension of GBS with the approval of GBS board, and the United Mission to Nepal. It is currently managed by the GBS/GCES public education trust under the supervision of the Ministry of Education, Nepal. It is affiliated to Pokhara University and provides a degree in B.E. Software, B.E. Computer(recently added) and complies with the Pokhara University's semester system and examination procedures. In 2003, GCES was admitted as a permanent member of Nepal Engineering Council.

GCES is an extension of GBS, which was established to provide higher studies in western Nepal. It was founded in 1998, and officially inaugurated in 1999. Currently, the college offers degree in Bachelors of Engineering (Software, Computer) and degree in Masters of Science (Information System Engineering) following the semester and examination system of Pokhara University. The college is a non-profit institution owned by the Ministry of Education—Nepal, and is managed by the GBS/GCES public education trust. Currently, there are about 300+ students and 30+ staffs.

History 
In keeping with GBS' commitment to providing opportunities for quality education in the Western Development Region of Nepal, GCS—an extension to GBS was established in 1998 and was affiliated to Pokhara University. The then honourable Education Minister Mr. Yog Prasad Upadhyay officially inaugurated Gandaki College of Sciences, an extension of GBS, on 27 November 1999. However, the new college began its first classes in August 1999 with enrolment of 22 boys and 6 girls in Computer Science, which was offered in the Western Region of Nepal. The program was affiliated with Pokhara University with partial expatriate from the United Mission to Nepal (UMN). Dr. Dale W. Rosenberg was the program coordinator of GCS.

Later, Engineering was introduced which replaced the B.Sc. course and hence the college was called Gandaki College of Engineering and Science (GCES).

Scholarships 

Being a non-profit organization, GCES supports academically bright and needy students with financial assistance to students. Scholarships are awarded to academically bright, economically disadvantaged, but intelligent and self-motivated students. These scholarships are provided primarily after an evaluation of students’ previous academic records and their financial needs as assessed by the scholarship committee.

GBS Scholarship

These are awarded to ex- GBS scholarship students who have demonstrated exceptional intellectual and personal qualities in academic areas.

Local Scholarship

These are awarded to economically disadvantaged students who are from the local areas like Lamachaur and Batulechaur.

Academic Awards

Merit based scholarships are also awarded to a number of students based on their academic achievements, performance, and their involvement in other educational activities. Each year, academic scholarships are awarded to students based on their performance in the college entrance examinations and their previous academic records. Academic award will be provided in 10:1 ratio. Students securing SGPA less than 3.0 are not eligible for academic award.

References

A brief history of GBS/GCES by Khadananda Sharma
GBS annual Magazine
The Golden Jubilee Report of Gandaki Boarding School

External links
College Website

Universities and colleges in Nepal
1998 establishments in Nepal